The  is a Japanese dual-voltage (1,500 V DC and 20 kV AC 60 Hz) electric multiple unit (EMU) train type first introduced by Japanese National Railways (JNR) in March 1986, and later operated on local services on the Hokuriku Main Line by the West Japan Railway Company (JR-West) from 1987 and also by the third-sector railway operating company Ainokaze Toyama Railway from March 2015. The units were built by re-using the underframes, bogies and electrical equipment from former 471 series and 473 series express-type EMUs with new suburban type bodies based on the design of the 417 series EMUs introduced in 1978.

Variants
 413-0 series: 29 cars converted from former 471 series cars
 413-100 series: two cars (KuMoHa 413-101 and MoHa 412-101) converted from former 473 series cars

Operations
JR-West trainsets are used on the Nanao Line, Hokuriku Main Line, and IR Ishikawa Railway. Ainokaze Toyama Railway trainsets are used on the Ainokaze Toyama Railway, IR Ishikawa Railway, and Echigo Tokimeki Railway.

Formations
, all 31 of the 413 series cars built are in service, with six three-car sets (including two 455 series cars) operated by JR-West and five three-car sets operated by Ainokaze Toyama Railway.

Trainsets consist of two motored ("Mc" and "M") cars and a non-powered driving trailer ("Tc") car, with the Tc car at the Kanazawa end.

 The MoHa 412 car is fitted with one PS21 lozenge-type pantograph.
 Sets B04 and B11 have a KuHa 455-700 driving car at the west (Kanazawa) end. These were converted from former SaHa 455 intermediate cars.
 Set B11 includes 413-100 series cars KuMoHa 413-101 and MoHa 412-101.

Interior
Passenger accommodation consists of a mixture of transverse four-person seating bays and longitudinal bench seating.

History
The eleven three-car sets were built between 1985 and 1989.

The former identities of the trainsets operated by Ainokaze Toyama Railway are as follows:

In 2016, Ainokaze Toyama Railway set AM03 was modified at JR-West's Kanazawa Workshop for use as a special-event train, receiving  branding and a new external livery.

Future developments
From the first half of fiscal 2018, an Ainokaze Toyama Railway 413 series set will be rebuilt as a tourist train, returning to service on the line in the second half of fiscal 2018.

Livery variations
Initially painted in maroon with a white stripe, the sets later received the JR-West "New Hokuriku" livery of "oyster white" with "light cobalt blue" lining. From 2012, some sets received the overall blue (color code "DIC N-897") livery applied to JR-West Kanazawa area local trainsets, however, the JR-West fleet was subsequently repainted into an overall crimson (color code "DIC N-715") Nanao Line livery, with all trainsets treated by August 2017.

JR-West

Ainokaze Toyama Railway

References

Electric multiple units of Japan
West Japan Railway Company
Train-related introductions in 1986

ja:国鉄413系・717系電車#413系
1500 V DC multiple units of Japan
20 kV AC multiple units